Curtis Harrison (born December 31, 1978 in Welland, Ontario) is a Canadian actor. Harrison co-starred in the Sci-Fi series 2030 CE, has guest-starred on various television shows and has worked both in front of and behind the camera since 2000. He is also known for playing legendary "Crazy Canuck" Steve Podborski in the CTV film Crazy Canucks.

External links

1978 births
Living people
Canadian male film actors
People from Welland
Male actors from Ontario
21st-century Canadian male actors